Haudricourt is a commune in the Seine-Maritime department in the Normandy region in northern France.

Geography
The commune borders the département of Oise.

Population

Places of interest
 A sixteenth century manorhouse at Beaufrêne
 The church of St.Jean & St.Martin, dating from the eleventh century.
 The church of Notre-Dame, dating from the sixteenth century.
 The church of St.Pierre, dating from the eighteenth century.

See also
Communes of the Seine-Maritime department

References

Communes of Seine-Maritime